Lowry Run is a stream in Preble County, Ohio, in the United States.

The name Lowry Run commemorates a battle between Lieutenant Lowry and Little Turtle.

Location
Mouth: Confluence with Goose Creek, Preble County at 
Source: Preble County at

See also
List of rivers of Ohio

References

Rivers of Preble County, Ohio
Rivers of Ohio